Su Rui (born 13 June 1952) is a Taiwanese singer. In 1968, Su Rui skipped class to participate in a singing competition and was selected, joining the Zero Chorus to sing Western pop songs, and began her singing career. Later, she joined the Action Choir, named Julie in English. In 1971, she graduated from high school and began to perform at the Qingquangang American Army Club (CCK) in Taichung with Yingying Huang and they became friends. In 1973, she became the first female singer in residence at the Taipei Hilton. She was recommended to perform at the Hilton Hotel in Hong Kong, singing in Hong Kong for 3 years. Before becoming a singer, Su Rui wanted to be a physical education teacher. At that time, she was good at track and field and basketball, so she hoped to be a teacher and teach students.

Her song "The Same Moonlight" (1983) first propelled her from an unknown to a singing sensation in Taiwan overnight when it was released in 1983. She is also known for her hit "Any Empty Wine Bottles For Sale", the widely popular soundtrack to the Taiwanese film Papa, Can You Hear Me Sing. Her popularity in Asia was equated with that of counterpart Teresa Teng, when her hit song "Follow Your Feelings" became hugely popular in the late 1980s.

In 2018, Su received the Special Contribution Award at the 29th Golden Melody Awards for her achievement in Mandopop music.

Discography
 Compilations are excluded from this list

UFO Records (Taiwan); titles of editions released by UFO Records are used, unless otherwise

 1983 — Su Rui
 The earliest Taiwanese cassette edition titles this album The Same Moonlight / Please Come with Me
 1984 — Turning Around Suddenly
 1984 —  3
 The earliest Taiwanese CD edition titles this album 
 1985 — 
 1985 — 1986
 Sometimes it is called 
 1986 — Millionaires Express / Heart of Dragon (single)
 Each song is a theme song of a film of the same name
 1986 — The Sixth Sense
 1987 — Rest, Work, Work Again (Cantonese)
 1987 — Changes (English)
 1988 —  (Japanese)
 1988 — Taipei–Tokyo
 1988 — All for Tomorrow
 1989 — With Love (Cantonese)
 1989 — I've Got the Music in Me (English)
 1993 — Holding Hands
 1994 — Unfaithful

Linfair Records Ltd
 1989 — Murder on the Orient Express
 1990 — Parked in My Gentle Heart

Golden Pony Records
 1993 — Loved Completely ) (Cantonese)

Forward Music Ltd
 1997 — Flower Branches
 1998 — Loving You So Much Since

Collaborations
 2006 - "I Wanna Understand You More" (我想更懂你), duet with Will Pan from Around the World (Mandarin, English) (Universal Music Taiwan)

References 

1952 births
Living people
Taiwanese Mandopop singers
Taiwanese Hokkien pop singers
Cantopop singers
Musicians from Taipei
20th-century Taiwanese women singers
21st-century Taiwanese women singers
Cantonese-language singers of Taiwan